The Aerospace Systems Engineering Squadron (ASE SQN) was a squadron of the Royal Australian Air Force, that designed and developed non-standard modifications, special test equipment and facilities, and telemetry functions to support flight tests.

ASE SQN was located at RAAF Base Edinburgh in Adelaide, South Australia.

In 2016, the squadron was amalgamated with the Aircraft Stores Compatibility Engineering Squadron, to form the Air Warfare Engineering Squadron.

References

 Air Force News Into the future
 ASESQN 11th Anniversary Aerospace Systems Engineering Squadron (ASESQN) celebrated their 11th Anniversary on 25 July 2014. ASESQN followed the tradition of having the oldest and youngest members of the unit cut the birthday cake.

RAAF squadrons